The Red River floods refer to the various flooding events in recent history of the Red River of the North, which forms the border between North Dakota and Minnesota and flows north, into Manitoba.

Around 16% of the Red River basin, excluding the Assiniboine basin, is located in Canada; the remainder is within The Dakotas and Minnesota.

List of floods 

Notable floods include the:
1826 Red River flood — the largest known in the Red River Valley.
1852 Red River flood
1861 Red River flood
1882 Red River flood
1897 Red River flood
1916 Red River flood
1945 Red River flood
1950 Red River flood — the largest flood in the Red River Valley since 1861. Major flooding took place in Winnipeg and the Red River Valley in April, May, and June.
1966 Red River flood
1969 Red River flood
1970 Red River flood
1974 Red River flood
1978 Red River flood
1979 Red River flood — represented the first major test of the Red River Floodway.
1987 Red River flood
1989 Red River flood
1996 Red River flood
1997 Red River flood — most severe flood in Manitoba's Red River Valley since 1852.
1997 Red River flood in the United States
1998 Red River flood
1999 Red River flood
2001 Red River flood
2006 Red River flood
2009 Red River flood — fourth highest flood on the Red River in Manitoba, since 1826.
2010 Red River flood
2011 Red River flood
2013 Red River flood
2015 Red River flood

References

Floods in the United States
Former disambiguation pages converted to set index articles
Floods in Canada
Floods
2015 disasters in Canada
2013 disasters in Canada
2010 disasters in Canada
2006 disasters in Canada
2001 disasters in Canada
1999 disasters in Canada
1998 disasters in Canada
1996 disasters in Canada
1989 disasters in Canada
1978 disasters in Canada
1969 disasters in Canada
1966 disasters in Canada
 
1979 disasters in Canada